Short track speed skating at the 1992 Winter Olympics was held from 18 to 22 February. Four events were contested at La halle de glace Olympique, located next to the Théâtre des Cérémonies, a couple of kilometers west of downtown Albertville. This was the first time short track speed skating was contested at the Winter Olympics.

Medal summary

Medal table

South Korea led the medal table with three, including two golds. Kim Ki-hoon's gold medal in the men's 1000 metre was the first Winter gold medal for South Korea. Kim also led the individual medal table, with two gold medals. The top women's medalist was American Cathy Turner, who won one gold and one silver.

Men's events

Women's events

Participating NOCs
Sixteen nations competed in the short track events at Albertville.

References

 
1992 Winter Olympics events
1992
1992 in short track speed skating